The Ambassador of the United Kingdom to Somalia is the United Kingdom's foremost diplomatic representative to the Federal Republic of Somalia.

On 25 April 2013, Britain re-opened its embassy in Mogadishu, the capital of Somalia, with British First Secretary of State William Hague attending the opening ceremony. On 6 June 2013, the British authorities appointed Neil Wigan as the new British Ambassador to Somalia, succeeding Matt Baugh.

Kate Foster became the ambassador in February 2021.

Ambassadors
1960–1961: Thomas Bromley
1961–1963: Lancelot Pyman
1963–1968: Diplomatic relations broken over the Northern Frontier District
1968–1970: Stephen Whitwell
1970–1973: James Bourn
1973–1976: John Shaw
1977–1980: Henry Brind
1980–1983: Michael Purcell
1983–1987: William Fullerton
1987–1989: Jeremy Varcoe
1989–1990: Ian McCluney
1991–2012: British Embassy in Mogadishu evacuated 6 January 1991 after collapse of Siad Barre administration and start of the civil war; relations maintained through the UK diplomatic office in Nairobi
2012–2013: Matt Baugh
2013–2015: Neil Wigan
2015–2016: Harriet Mathews
2017–2019: David Concar
2019–2021: Ben Fender

2021–2023: Kate Foster
2023-present: Holly Tett

References

External links
UK and Somalia, gov.uk

Somalia
 
United Kingdom Ambassadors